Aadbel    (also Idbil) is a small town in Akkar Governorate, Lebanon.

The population in Aadbel is mainly  Greek Orthodox Christians and Greek Catholic.

History
In 1838, Eli Smith noted  the village, which he called 'Adbel, located east of esh-Sheikh Mohammed. The residents were  Greek Orthodox Christians.

References

Bibliography

External links
Aadbel, Localiban 

Populated places in Akkar District
Eastern Orthodox Christian communities in Lebanon